Eupithecia obscurata is a moth in the  family Geometridae. It is found in French Guiana.

References

Moths described in 1906
obscurata
Moths of South America